As of January 2022, the International Union for Conservation of Nature (IUCN) lists 1193 data deficient amphibian species. 16% of all evaluated amphibian species are listed as data deficient. 
No subpopulations of amphibians have been evaluated by the IUCN.

This is a complete list of data deficient amphibian species and subspecies as evaluated by the IUCN. Where possible common names for taxa are given while links point to the scientific name used by the IUCN.

Salamanders
There are 50 salamander species assessed as data deficient.

Lungless salamanders

Asiatic salamanders

Mole salamanders

Salamandrids

Frogs
There are 1044 frog species assessed as data deficient.

Water frogs

Robber frogs

Robust frogs

Dancing frogs

Alsodids

Shrub frogs

Cryptic forest frogs

True toads

Fleshbelly frogs

Glass frogs

Batrachylids

Litter frogs

Screeching frogs

Hemiphractids

Cycloramphids

Poison dart frogs

Mantellids

Ceratobatrachids

Fork-tongued frogs

Narrow-mouthed frogs

True frogs

Australian water frogs

Puddle frogs

Hylids

African reed frogs

Tongueless frogs

Pyxicephalids

Shovelnose frogs

Odontophrynids

Ptychadenids

Southern frogs

Saddleback toads

Hylodids

Other frog species

Gymnophiona
There are 99 species in the order Gymnophiona assessed as data deficient.

Scolecomorphids

Indotyphlids

Ichthyophiids

Dermophiids

Typhlonectids

Siphonopids

Caeciliids

Rhinatrematids

Other Gymnophiona species

See also 
 Lists of IUCN Red List data deficient species
 List of least concern amphibians
 List of near threatened amphibians
 List of vulnerable amphibians
 List of endangered amphibians
 List of critically endangered amphibians
 List of recently extinct amphibians

References 

Amphibians
Data deficient amphibians
Data deficient amphibians